Alt er tabt is an album by Under Byen released in 2010. Alt er tabt means "all is lost" in Danish. It was described by Pitchfork as a "dark, tense record full of spartan arrangements and songs built more around moody atmosphere than melodic hooks."

Track listing 
All tracks by Under Byen

 "8" – 2:09
 "Territorium" – 3:49
 "Alt Er Tabt" – 3:43
 "Således" – 3:09
 "Ikke Latteren Men Øjeblikket Lige Efter" – 3:27
 "Unoder" – 5:49
 "Konstant" – 5:21
 "Er Noget Smukt Glemt Findes Det Muligvis Endnu" – 4:15
 "Kapitel 1" – 4:08
 "Protokol" – 3:25

Personnel 

 Henriette Sennenvaldt – vocals, lyricist
 Rasmus Kjær Larsen – pianos
 Nils Gröndahl – violin, saw, lapsteel, a variety of guitar pedals
 Morten Larsen – drums
 Sara Saxild – bass
 Anders Stochholm – percussion, accordion, harmonica, guitar
 Stine Sørensen – drums, percussion
 Morten Svenstrup – cello

References

2010 albums
Under Byen albums